The Archos GamePad is a video gaming tablet developed and marketed by Archos. It runs on the Android operating system. It was announced on August 29, 2012 and was first released on 6 December 2012 in Europe, with a US release projected for February 2013. The tablet is aimed at gaming, and features dedicated dual analog sticks along with regular gaming keys and shoulder buttons - a similar design as the PlayStation Vita. Archos have designed a technology which 'converts' the touch controls (of Android games) into physical controls from the buttons. It is able to get over a thousand games from the Google Play library.

Archos GamePad features a 7-inch screen, 8GB of internal storage, 16 physical buttons, a 0.3 MP front camera, and stereo speakers. It is 10mm thick and weights 300 grams. Archos have developed a special mapping software for developers to officially make their game(s) compatible with the GamePad's physical buttons.

Release
Archos retailed GamePad in the UK for £130, although Archos originally had said that the tablet will sell for "under £130" The GamePad has a 7" screen.

Gamepad 2
In August 2013, it was revealed that Archos is working on a successor, called Archos GamePad 2.

See also
 Wii U GamePad
 JXD S7300
 Wikipad

References

External links
 Official Website

Tablet computers
Android (operating system) devices
Tablet computers introduced in 2012